Edgar Johnson (December 12, 1905 – January 19, 1977) was an American rower. He competed in the men's coxless four event at the 1932 Summer Olympics.

References

External links
 

1905 births
1977 deaths
American male rowers
Olympic rowers of the United States
Rowers at the 1932 Summer Olympics
Rowers from Philadelphia